Events in India in 1761

Incumbents
 Shah Alam II, Mughal Emperor, reigned 10 December 1759 – 19 November 1806
 Brigadier general John Carnac, Commander-in Chief of India December 1860– April 1761
 Lieutenant-General Eyre Coote (East India Company officer), Commander-in Chief of India April 1761– 1763
 Mir Qasim, Nawab of Bengal and Murshidabad, 20 October 1760 – 7 July 1763

Events
National income - ₹9,456 million
 14 January – Third Battle of Panipat

Births

Deaths
 14 January
 Sadashivrao Bhau, 30, CINC of Maratha Army of India
 Vishwasrao
 Ibrahim Khan Gardi
 Shamsher Bahadur I
 Jankoji Rao Scindia
 23 June - Nanasaheb Peshwa, 3rd Peshwa of Maratha Empire
 9 December – Tarabai, Queen of Maratha Empire. (b. 1675)

References

 
Years of the 18th century in India